Weightlifting at the 2017 Islamic Solidarity Games was held in Azerbaijan Weightlifting Academy, Baku from 13 to 17 May 2017.

Medalists

Men

Women

Medal table

References

Results Book

External links 
 Official website
 Results

Islamic Solidarity Games
2017
2017 Islamic Solidarity Games
Weightlifting in Azerbaijan